Shruti Haasan is an Indian actress, composer and playback singer who works in Telugu, Hindi and Tamil films. Born into the prominent Haasan family, she is the daughter of actors Kamal Haasan and Sarika. Shruti Haasan started her career as a playback singer at the age of six in the 1992 Tamil film Thevar Magan. She later made a cameo appearance in her father's Tamil-Hindi bilingual directorial Hey Ram (2000) as a child artist. Haasan's first major appearance was in the Hindi film Luck (2009), in which she played a dual role of a woman avenging her twin sister's death. She played the female lead in the films Anaganaga O Dheerudu and 7aum Arivu; both were released in 2011 and together earned her the Best Female Debut – South at the 59th Filmfare Awards South ceremony. Her subsequent releases Oh My Friend (2011) and 3 (2012) were commercially unsuccessful. The latter earned her a nomination for the Best Actress – Tamil at the 60th Filmfare Awards South ceremony. A turning point came in Haasan's career with Harish Shankar commercially successful Telugu film Gabbar Singh (2012). The release was followed by a series of successful films such as Balupu (2013) and Yevadu (2014). She received her first Filmfare Award for Best Actress – Telugu for her performance in Race Gurram (2014).

In 2015, Haasan played the female lead in five films: Gabbar Is Back and Welcome Back in Hindi, Srimanthudu in Telugu, and Puli and Vedalam in Tamil. Except Puli, the rest of the releases achieved commercial success. She earned a nomination for the Best Actress – Telugu award at the 63rd Filmfare Awards South ceremony for her performance in Srimanthudu. The following year, she had two releases: Rocky Handsome and Premam. The latter, a Telugu remake of the 2015 Malayalam-language film of the same name, drew criticism for Haasan's casting before its release. She played the role of a young college lecturer with a slightly stern approach towards her students. The remake gained positive critical reception, and earned average returns. Her Tamil film Si3 had a delayed theatrical release in 2017; it was a commercial success.

Films

Television

Short films

Voice artist

Notes

References

External links 
 

Indian filmographies
Actress filmographies